is an action-adventure game developed and published by Sega for the Game Gear. It was released exclusively in Japan in 1995, however currently there is an English patch for the game released by Aeon Genesis.

The music for the game was composed by Saori Kobayashi, who also contributed to the soundtracks of Sega's Panzer Dragoon Saga and Panzer Dragoon Orta.

Gameplay
Sylvan Tale follows the typical action-adventure game formula: The player controls a character called Zetts who must solve puzzles, fight enemies, and talk to non-player characters in order to acquire special powers and items that will allow him to unlock new areas of the game world and solve the puzzles within. While the player may revisit areas, the game progresses in an essentially linear fashion, as each area can only be accessed if Zetts has acquired a specific item or ability from the previous area.

References
Sylvan Tale at SMSPower.org
Fan translation at romhacking.net

External links

1995 video games
Action-adventure games
Fantasy video games
Game Gear games
Game Gear-only games
Japan-exclusive video games
Sega video games
Video games scored by Saori Kobayashi
Video games developed in Japan